The following is a list of American scientists.

A

 Felicie Albert
 Louis Agassiz

B

 Donna Baird
 Mary C. Baltz
 Charles Bartley
 Hans D. Baumann
 Robert Nason Beck
 Robert O. Becker
 Charles Emerson Beecher
 James F. Bell, III
 Arden L. Bement, Jr.
 May R. Berenbaum
 Joseph Young Bergen
 Helen M. Berman
 Harvey Bialy
 John Bidwell
 Amasa Stone Bishop
 Victor Gustav Bloede
 James Bloodworth Jr.
 Hendrik Wade Bode
 Mark Boslough
 Karel Bossart
 William C. Boyd
 Herbert Boyer
 Robert S. Boyer
 John Brashear
 Martin Stanislaus Brennan
 Charles Brenner
 David M. Brienza
 Lyman James Briggs
 Robert William Briggs
 David Britz
 Samuel Broder
 Lester R. Brown
 Robert Brownlee
 Clifford E. Brubaker
 Frank W. Bubb, Sr.
 Linda B. Buck
 Bernard Budiansky
 Willy Burgdorfer
 Harold Saxton Burr
 Robert W. Bussard

C

 William H. Cade
 John W. Cahn
 John B. Calhoun
 David Callaway
 Neil Campbell
 Ann Z. Caracristi
 Shawn Carlson
 George Robert Carruthers
 Carlos Castillo-Chavez
 Don Catlin
 Anthony Cerami
 Haroutioun Hovanes Chakmakjian
 Martin Chalfie
 Thomas C. Chalmers
 Dean Roden Chapman
 James Chin
 Charles L. Christ
 Christian Pike
 Chu Ching-wu
 William C. Clark
 Marjorie Clarke
 Steven Clarke
 G. Marius Clore
 Janice E. Clements
 Manfred Clynes
 Edwin Joseph Cohn
 Ellen Cohn
 L. Stephen Coles
 James Bryant Conant
 Albert Coons
 Franklin Seaney Cooper
 Alfred L. Copley
 Robert Corell
 Eugene E. Covert
 Jerry Coyne
 Dwight Crandell
 Robert K. Crane
 Harriet Creighton
 John Culliney
 Harold Cummins
 Joseph Augustine Cushman

D

 Clarence Madison Dally
 Walter Dandy
 Wilbur Davenport
 Kelvin Davies
 James Henry Deese
 Edmund B. Delabarre
 David Deming
 Harry Demopoulos
 Victor Denenberg
 Chester Dewey
 Michael Dirr
 Paul M. Doty
 Hugh Latimer Dryden
 Peter Duesberg
 Louis Dunn
 Wendell E. Dunn, Jr.
 Nguyet Anh Duong
 Samuel T. Durrance
 John Durrant
 August Dvorak

E

 Richard H. Ebright
 Roger L. Easton
 Murray Eden
 Thomas Edison
 Ron Eglash
 Albert Ellis
 Paul Hugh Emmett
 John Franklin Enders
 Terry Erwin
 Hiram Bond Everest
 James Ewing

F

 David J. Farber
 Harrison Farber
 Richard Feynman
 Christopher Field
 Caleb Finch
 Mark Fishman
 John Adam Fleming
 Paul Flory
 Rousseau H. Flower
 Francis B. Foley
 Michael Fossel
 Dian Fossey
 Carol Fowler
 Samuel Fowler
 Robert France
 Benjamin Franklin
 David Franklin
 Childs Frick
 Jeffrey M. Friedman
 Carl Frosch

G

 Elmer L. Gaden
 Daniel Carleton Gajdusek
 Mark Galassi
 Jay Gan
 Merrill Garnett
 Ralph W. Gerard
 Eloise Gerry
 Andrea Ghez
 Albert Ghiorso
 Barrie Gilbert
 Frank Bunker Gilbreth, Sr.
 Lillian Moller Gilbreth
 Robert Gilman
 Stanton Glantz
 Peter Glaser
 Peter Gleick
 George H. Goble
 Calvin Goddard
 Alan H Goldstein
 Lawrence S.B. Goldstein
 John B. Goodenough
 John Gorrie
 John Stanton Gould
 Temple Grandin
 Evelyn Boyd Granville
 Ralph Grayson
 Michael Graziano
 Cecil Howard Green
 Richard J. Green
 Kevin Greenaugh
 Michael E. Greenberg
 Lewis Joel Greene
 Carol Greider
 Alan Grodzinsky
 Stephen Grossberg
 Ernst Guillemin
 Charles Claude Guthrie

H

 Nelson Hairston
 Thomas Callister Hales
 John D. Hamaker
 Debora Hammond
 Mary Styles Harris
 Edwin B. Hart
 William M. Hartmann
 Leland H. Hartwell
 Stephen Harvey
 Caryl Parker Haskins
 Michael Hasselmo
 Kristy Hawkins
 Brian Hayes
 Eric J. Heller
 Karl Gordon Henize
 Charles B. Hensley
 Alfred Hershey
 John Heuser
 Jody Hey
 Craig L. Hill
 Ronald K. Hoeflin
 Dean Hoge
 Theo Holm
 Erna Schneider Hoover
 Grace Hopper
 Jay Hosler
 Benjamin Hsiao
 Edwin Hubble
 Mike Hudak
 Gordon Ferrie Hull
 Fazle Hussain

I

 Shinya Inoué

J

 Eastman Jacobs
 Robert M. Jacobson
 Rakesh Jain
 Ramesh Jain
 Bruce Jakosky
 John T. James
 William Jeffrey
 Alejandro Jenkins
 Jim Mullins
 Joaquin Fuster
 Kathleen R. Johnson
 Herrick L. Johnston
 Karla Jurvetson

K

 Gordon L. Kane
 Charles K. Kao
 Edward Kasner
 Jerome Kavka
 Yoshihiro Kawaoka
 Donald Keck
 Charles David Keeling
 Klaus Keil
 Ann Kiessling
 Edwin D. Kilbourne
 James Rhyne Killian
 Kim Sung-Hou
 J. Peter Kincaid
 Ebenezer Kinnersley
 Ruth L. Kirschstein
 Harry Kloor
 J. Val Klump
 Brian Kobilka
 Rudolf Kompfner
 Daniel Kopans
 Michael J. Krische
 David E. Kuhl
 Thomas Kuhn
 Stephanie Kwolek

L

 Jeffrey Laitman
 Edwin H. Land
 David A. Lane
 Samuel Pierpont Langley
 Irving Langmuir
 Robert Ledley
 Rudolph Leibel
 Zachary Lemnios
 Allenna Leonard
 Norman N. Li
 Sidney H. Liebson
 Eli Lilly
 Paul J. Lioy
 John T. Lis
 Leigh Lisker
 Timothy M. Lohman
 Alfred Lee Loomis
 Lorraine Lisiecki
 Joseph Lovering
 Raymond Luebbers
 David T. Lykken

M

 Dennis McCarthy
 Barbara McClintock
 Celeste McCollough
 L. Hamilton McCormick
 Stacy McGaugh
 Michael McKubre
 Richard Cockburn Maclaurin
 Brian MacWhinney
 Eugene O. Major
 Ho-Kwang Mao
 John Marburger
 Noella Marcellino
 Lynn Margulis
 Julius Marmur
 William F. Martin
 Bruce E. Maryanoff
 Cynthia A. Maryanoff
 Deborah Mash
 Kirstin Matthews
 Walter Mauderli
 Matthew Fontaine Maury
 Richard L. Meier
 Thomas Corwin Mendenhall
 George W. Merck
 Antonio Meucci
 George H. Miller
 Raymond D. Mindlin
 Ormsby M. Mitchel
 William A. Mitchell
 Scott L. Montgomery
 Philip Morrison
 Jürgen Moser
 Adilson E. Motter
 Forrest S. Mozer
 Ferid Murad
 William P. Murphy Jr.

N

 Roger D. Nelson
 M. Graham Netting
 Gerry Neugebauer
 Marcia Neugebauer
 William F. Neuman
 Sarfaraz K. Niazi
 Nicholas E. Wagman
 Landon Curt Noll
 Nikolay Prokof’ev

O

 John A. O'Keefe
 Camellia Okpodu
 Brian O'Leary
 S. Jay Olshansky
 Henry John Orchard
 Michael Orshansky
 Arnold Edward Ortmann
 Simon Ostrach
 David Ostry
 Dan Otte

P

 Becky Wai-Ling Packard
 Irvine Page
 Salvatore Pais
 Sanford Palay
 J. A. Panitz
 Dan James Pantone
 John Parascandola
 Rudolph Pariser
 Patrick G. Carrick
 Randy Pausch
 Jerome Pearson
 E. Converse Peirce 2nd
 Jacob Perkins
 Alan Perlis
 Leonid Perlovsky
 William C. Pfefferle
 William Daniel Phillips
 John R. Pierce
 Kyle Pierce
 Elizabeth Pisani
 William Poduska
 Sergey Polyakov
 Stephen Porges
 George Poste
 Sandra Postel
 Laramie Potts
 Nader Pourmand
 William T. Powers
 George R. Price
 Joseph Priestley
 John Charles Priscu

R

 Ronald F. Probstein
 Merle Randall
 Anatol Rapoport
 Paul Raskin
 Stuart C. Ray
 Arthur Emmons Raymond
 Grote Reber
 Allan Rechtschaffen
 Christopher M. Reddy
 Jane Reece
 Robert Remez
 Lauren Resnick
 John Leonard Riddell
 Paul Ridker
 Royal Rife
 David Rittenhouse
 John Robbins
 Anita Roberts
 Arthur B. Robinson
 Julia Robinson
 John Rock
 Ignacio Rodriguez-Iturbe
 Lynn Rogers
 Emily Rosa
 Karol G. Ross
 Francis Peyton Rous
 Subrata Roy (scientist)
 George C. Royal
 Edmund Ruffin
 Rodney S. Ruoff
 Howard A. Rusk

S

 Raymond St. Leger
 Elliot Saltzman
 Ram Samudrala
 Thomas J. Samuelian
 Berta Scharrer
 Stanley F. Schmidt
 David P. Schmitt
 Francis O. Schmitt
 Edward L. Schneider
 Allan Schore
 Charles Anthony Schott
 Jeffrey H. Schwartz
 William C. Schwartz
 Katherine D. Seelman
 John H. Seinfeld
 Homayoun Seraji
 Ed Seykota
 Michael Shermer
 Landrum Brewer Shettles
 Kalidas Shetty
 Jay Short
 Deepak Shukla
 Clifford Shull
 Steven J. Sibener
 Robert F. Siliciano
 Leslie Earl Simon
 Robert L. Simpson, Jr.
 Robert Simpson
 Lawrence B. Slobodkin
 Richard H. Small
 Jon Michael Smith
 Robert R. Sokal
 Edmund Sonnenblick
 Steve Spangler
 Morgan Sparks
 Richard O. Spertzel
 Sol Spiegelman
 George Starkey (alchemist)
 Thomas Starzl
 Michael Stebbins
 Allen Steere
 Charles Proteus Steinmetz
 Friedrich Stephan
 Guy Sternberg
 Stephen Sternberg
 Barry Stevens
 Charles Edward Stevens
 Ralph Randles Stewart
 Howard A. Stone
 Jeremy Stone
 Thomas Blanchard Stowell
 Wilma Subra
 Sunil Kumar Ahuja
 Pearl Swanson
 Randy Sweeney
 Thomas W. Swetnam

T

 Doris Taylor
 Bonnie C. Templeton
 Vivien Thomas
 Benjamin Thompson
 Edward O. Thorp
 Victor A. Tiedjens
 Michael Tordoff
 Frederick Pearson Treadwell
 Mead Treadwell
 Trinh Xuan Thuan
 Jared Tinklenberg
 Greg Tseng
 Krystal Tsosie
 Peter Tsou
 Merle Tuve
 Neil deGrasse Tyson

U

 Stuart Umpleby

V

 Sergiy Vilkomir
 Raymond Viskanta
 Louis R. Vitullo
 Tuan Vo-Dinh
 Bert Vogelstein
 John Volkman

W

 William Hultz Walker
 Mansukh C. Wani
 Brian Wansink
 Warren Winkelstein
 James D. Watson
 Owen Webster
 Richard Weiszmann
 Guenter Wendt
 Paul Werbos
 James Westphal
 Douglas Whalen
 Woodrow Whitlow Jr.
 William T. Wickner
 Sheila Widnall
 John R. Wiegand
 Richard Wiese
 John Wilbanks
 Don Craig Wiley
 Samuel Wendell Williston
 Beth Willman
 Bryan Willson
 Ian Wilson
 Charles F. Winslow
 John A. Wise
 Carl Woese
 Flossie Wong-Staal
 Richard D. Wood
 Robert A. Woodruff
 Gordon Woods
 Robert Simpson Woodward
 Theodore Salisbury Woolsey Jr.
 Jerome J. Workman Jr.
 Arthur W. Wright
 Peter Wright
 Joshua Wurman

X

 Xuong Nguyen-Huu
 Xiangzhong Yang

Y

 J. Scott Yaruss
 K. Aslihan Yener 
 Mariano Yogore

Z

 Paul Zamecnik
 Marlene Zuk

See also

 Lists of Americans
 Lists of scientists
 Science and technology in the United States

Scientists
American
Scientists